Antonio Marku (born 24 March 1992) is an Albanian footballer who plays as a left back for KF Vëllaznimi in Kosovo.

Career

Early career
Marku began playing football with the youth teams of his local team Vllaznia Shkodër but in 2010 due to his university studies he moved to Tirana, where he began playing for Dinamo Tirana. He was part of the Dinamo Tirana U-19 side for the 2010–11 season where he was the team captain.

Marku made his professional debut against Flamurtari Vlorë on 20 April 2011 in a 6–2 loss, coming on as a substitute in the 57th minute for Nurudeen Orelesi. He was then promoted to the starting line-up for the 2011–12 season because of Dinamo's extreme financial difficulties which resulted in nearly all of the senior players to leave the club in the summer. In the summer of 2013 he joined FK Kukësi.

Vllaznia Shkodër
On 24 January 2016, during the first leg of the quarter-finals of the 2015–16 Albanian Cup against Skënderbeu Korçë, Marku suffered a head-to-head collision with Skënderbeu's Ademir, forcing him to leave the field with a stretcher and was immediately sent to the nearest hospital along with Ademir.

Drenica
On 17 August 2019 Marku announced on his Facebook profile, that he had joined KF Drenica in Kosovo.

Career statistics

Club

References

External links

 Vllaznia Shkodër official profile
 

1992 births
Living people
Footballers from Shkodër
Albanian footballers
Albanian expatriate footballers
Albania under-21 international footballers
Albania youth international footballers
Association football defenders
FK Dinamo Tirana players
KF Laçi players
KF Vllaznia Shkodër players
FK Kukësi players
KF Drenica players
KF Vëllaznimi players
Kategoria Superiore players
Kategoria e Parë players
Albanian expatriate sportspeople in Kosovo
Expatriate footballers in Kosovo